The Diamantino River is a river of Goiás state in central Brazil.

See also
List of rivers of Goiás

References
Brazilian Ministry of Transport

Rivers of Goiás